Samet Aybaba (born 3 February 1955, in Osmaniye) is a UEFA Pro Licensed Turkish football manager and former player.

Career
He was born 2 March 1955 in Adana. He began a football career in İskenderunspor. He transferred to Beşiktaş JK in 1977–78 season. He played as defender and midfielder in Beşiktaş JK. He played 334 matches for Beşiktaş and scored 7 goals. He won 2 League Championships, 1 Presidency Cup, 1 Prime Ministry Cup and 2 TSYD Cups and retired after finishing the 1987–88 season. He coached clubs such as Ankaragücü, Kayserispor, Vanspor, Adana Demirspor, Gençlerbirliği, Gaziantepspor, Trabzonspor and Ankaraspor. Aybaba won two Turkish Cups—one with Gençlerbirliği in a final against Fenerbahçe SK and one with Trabzonspor. He also won the Efes Pilsen tournament with Trabzonspor defeating Fenerbahçe SK in the final. He signed with Beşiktaş J.K. as a new coach on 16 June 2012. His contract was terminated on 20 May 2013.

International career
Samet was a youth international for Turkey.

Managerial statistics

Honours

Player honours
Beşiktaş
 Süper Lig (2): 1981–82, 1985–86
 Turkish Super Cup (1): 1986
 Chancellor Cup (2): 1977, 1988

Managerial honours
Ankaragücü
 Chancellor Cup (1): 1991
Gençlerbirliği
 Turkish Cup (1): 2000–01
Trabzonspor
 Turkish Cup (1): 2002–03
Sivasspor
 TFF First League (1): 2016–17
Adana Demirspor
 TFF First League (1): 2020–21

References

External links
 
 Samet Aybaba at Soccerway
 

1955 births
Living people
Turkish football managers
Süper Lig managers
Beşiktaş J.K. managers
Gençlerbirliği S.K. managers
Bursaspor managers
Çaykur Rizespor managers
Gaziantepspor managers
Trabzonspor managers
Kayseri Erciyesspor managers
Adana Demirspor managers
Antalyaspor managers
Eskişehirspor managers
Turkey under-21 international footballers
Turkey youth international footballers
Bucaspor managers
Association football defenders
Association football players not categorized by nationality